Centrodera dayi is a species in the family Cerambycidae ("long-horned beetles"), in the order Coleoptera ("beetles").
Centrodera dayi is found in North America.

References

Further reading
 American Beetles, Volume II: Polyphaga: Scarabaeoidea through Curculionoidea, Arnett, R.H. Jr., M. C. Thomas, P. E. Skelley and J. H. Frank. (eds.). 2002. CRC Press LLC, Boca Raton, FL.
 American Insects: A Handbook of the Insects of America North of Mexico, Ross H. Arnett. 2000. CRC Press.
 Monné, Miguel A., and Edmund F. Giesbert (1995). Checklist of the Cerambycidae and Disteniidae (Coleoptera) of the Western Hemisphere, 2nd ed., xiv + 420.
 Peterson Field Guides: Beetles, Richard E. White. 1983. Houghton Mifflin Company.

Lepturinae
Beetles described in 1963